Held under the Local Government (Scotland) Act 1973. Annandale and Eskdale was also under the regional council of Dumfries and Galloway.

As with the other two elections, no political parties fielded any candidates.

There were only 3 contested seats.

Results by Ward

References

Annandale
Dumfries and Galloway Council elections